Barry John Middleton  (born 12 January 1984) is regarded as one of the greatest British field hockey players in history. He played as a midfielder and forward for England and Great Britain and is the most capped British hockey player in history and captained his country for many years.

Middleton was appointed Member of the Order of the British Empire (MBE) in the 2020 New Year Honours for services to hockey.

Club career
Middleton plays club hockey in the Men's England Hockey League Premier Division for Holcombe.
He has previously played club hockey for East Grinstead, Dutch club HGC, Cannock and Doncaster.

On 28 June 2021 he was appointed Director of Hockey for Holcombe, whilst continuing to play for them.

International career
He made his international debut, aged 19, in April 2003 against Belgium and was a member of the Great Britain squad that finished ninth at the 2004 Summer Olympics in Athens, fifth in the 2008 Summer Olympics in Beijing, and fourth at the 2012 Summer Olympics in London. He was part of the England squad that won the 2009 Eurohockey Nations Cup. He captained the England squad that won bronze at the 2014 Commonwealth Games.

On 24 May 2014 he became the most capped English hockey international when he played his 308th international game. (203 for England, 105 for Great Britain). The match was against Australia at Bisham Abbey, Berkshire.
The previous record holder was Russell Garcia with 307 GB/England caps.

He was named in the International Hockey Federation's All-Star team in 2008, 2009 and 2010, and was shortlisted for 'Player of the Year' in those three years.

On 4 December 2017 he played his 400th international match. (255 for England, 145 for Great Britain). The match was against Australia in the 2016–17 Men's FIH Hockey World League Final, Bhubaneswar, India.

On 19 December 2018 it was announced that he is taking a break from international hockey in 2019.

On 8 April 2019 he announced his retirement from international hockey.

On 2 February 2022 it was announced that he would be an Assistant Coach for England for some of the FIH Hockey Pro League matches, in the coming months.

References

External links
 

1984 births
Living people
Sportspeople from Doncaster
English male field hockey players
Cannock Hockey Club players
East Grinstead Hockey Club players
Der Club an der Alster players
Holcombe Hockey Club players
HGC players
Men's England Hockey League players
English expatriate sportspeople in Germany
English expatriate sportspeople in India
Olympic field hockey players of Great Britain
Field hockey players at the 2004 Summer Olympics
Field hockey players at the 2006 Commonwealth Games
2006 Men's Hockey World Cup players
Field hockey players at the 2008 Summer Olympics
Field hockey players at the 2010 Commonwealth Games
2010 Men's Hockey World Cup players
Field hockey players at the 2012 Summer Olympics
Field hockey players at the 2014 Commonwealth Games
2014 Men's Hockey World Cup players
Field hockey players at the 2016 Summer Olympics
2018 Men's Hockey World Cup players
Commonwealth Games bronze medallists for England
Commonwealth Games medallists in field hockey
Members of the Order of the British Empire
Medallists at the 2014 Commonwealth Games